EVN Report is a non-profit online news site covering Armenian news for an English-speaking audience. It is based in Yerevan, from which it gets its namesake (EVN is the IATA airport code for Yerevan's Zvartnots International Airport).

History
The site began publishing in 2017 but launched to prominence during the 2018 Velvet Revolution in Armenia, as a major source of English-language reporting. After its start at the Yerevan Impact Hub incubator center, it moved into its own office space in 2019.

Besides covering current news, EVN Report also places emphasis on policy areas that it considers neglected by other outlets. As a non-profit organization, it is funded through donations made by readers. It has also received a grant from the National Endowment for Democracy.

References

External links
 
 Reputable Companies

Armenian news websites
News agencies based in Armenia
Newspapers published in Armenia